The following lists the number one albums on the Australian Albums Chart during the 1970s. 
The source for this decade is the Kent Music Report.

1970

1971

1972

1973

1974

1975

1976

1977

1978

 1 The Grease soundtrack spent nine of its weeks at number one in 1978 (as is shown here), and four in the 1990s—three in 1991 and one in 1998.

1979

See also
List of artists who reached number one on the Australian singles chart
Music of Australia
List of UK Albums Chart number ones
List of Billboard 200 number-one albums

References
David Kent's Australian Chart Book: based on the Kent Music Report
Australian Record Industry Association (ARIA) official site

1970s
Number-one albums
Australia Albums